Jacob Mulenga (born 12 February 1984) is a Zambian former professional footballer who played as a striker. 

Mulenga started his footballing career at age 18 with hometown club Afrisport, before moving to Châteauroux in 2004. Five years later, he moved to FC Utrecht where he made his definitive breakthrough but also suffered two serious knee injuries. After successful stints in Turkey and China, Mulenga returned to the Netherlands in 2020 where he signed for Go Ahead Eagles.

Between 2004 and 2014, he made 41 appearances scoring nine goals for the Zambia national team.

Club career
Mulenga started his career with the Zambian third-tier club Afrisport from his hometown of Kitwe at a relatively late age – he only started playing organised football as an 18-year old. With Afrisport whom he reached promotion in the 2003 season. In December 2003, he trialled together with fellow countryman Collins Mbesuma at French club Stade Rennais. However, both were unable to gain a contract, after which Mulenga returned to Afrisport. He had a strong season there, including four goals during the first three matches. In the summer of 2004, he returned to France for a trial period at Bastia alongside Billy Mwanza. After the Corsican club did not offer him a contract, LB Châteauroux showed interest in him and he was subsequently signed on a four-year contract. Mulenga thus became the second Zambian in the French professional divisions, after Andrew Tembo who played for Marseille in 1994.

In his Ligue 2 debut on 24 August 2004, Mulenga scored both goals in a 2–0 win over Chamois Niortais. In the ensuing period, however, he suffered a large number of injuries, limiting his appearances in the league that year to 15. In the two seasons that followed, he played more often, but his goalscoring stagnated. In August 2007, he was sent on a one-season loan to Ligue 1 club RC Strasbourg. After this period the Zambian returned to Châteauroux. 

In late May 2009, the club announced that Mulenga had been signed by Dutch Eredivisie club FC Utrecht, who, after a disappointing season, had been looking for a striker and eventually signed him on a three-year contract. On 31 October 2010, in a match against ADO Den Haag, he tore his right cruciate ligament and was sidelined for the entire 2010–11 season. On 14 August 2011, Mulenga made his comeback and marked this by turning a 0–2 deficit against De Graafschap into a 2–2 final result after scoring two goals. In a match against Ajax on 9 November, however, he tore his left cruciate ligament and was sidelined for eight months.

In August 2014, Mulenga signed with Turkish club Adana Demirspor, before moving to Chinese football six months later. He moved from Shijiazhuang Ever Bright to Liaoning Hongyun in January 2018, where he, in October 2018, became team captain. In February 2020, he signed a contract extension until the end of 2020. In April 2020, it was announced that Mulenga was suing his club, after not receiving his salary throughout the 2019 season. In May 2020, Liaoning Hongyun went bankrupt and Mulenga was left without a club. 

In October 2020, he joined Dutch second-tier Eerste Divisie club Go Ahead Eagles as a free agent. He immediately scored in his debut on 17 October, after coming on as a substitute in the 69th minute against FC Eindhoven, as Go Ahead won 3–0.

On 30 April 2022, Mulenga announced his retirement from football after the 2021–22 season. He scored in his last match as a professional footballer, a 3–1 league loss to SC Heerenveen, after having come on as a substitute.

International career
Mulenga progressed through several national Zambian youth teams and was called up to the senior team in a match against Sudan in May 2004, at the age of twenty, because of his good performances in the second division of Zambia. In the 2006 FIFA World Cup qualifiers, he scored against Togo in the first match of the group stage. However, the third place in the standings was not enough for Zambia to qualify for the World Cup. The country did however manage to qualify for the 2006 Africa Cup of Nations at the expense of the DR Congo and Mali. Due to an injury, Mulenga did receive any caps during this tournament, but two years later he was part of the team's starting eleven during the 2008 Africa Cup of Nations, and scored the 2–0 goal in a 3–0 win over Sudan. Zambia did not advance from the group stage in this tournament. Mulenga also had to cancel due to an injury for the 2012 Africa Cup of Nations.

Personal life
Mulenga is a Christian.

Career statistics

Club

International

Scores and results list Zambia's goal tally first, score column indicates score after each Mulenga goal.

References

External links
 
 
 Jacob Mulenga at Voetbal International 

Living people
1984 births
People from Kitwe
Association football forwards
Zambian footballers
LB Châteauroux players
RC Strasbourg Alsace players
FC Utrecht players
Adana Demirspor footballers
Cangzhou Mighty Lions F.C. players
Liaoning F.C. players
Go Ahead Eagles players
Eredivisie players
Eerste Divisie players
TFF First League players
Chinese Super League players
China League One players
Ligue 1 players
Ligue 2 players
Zambia international footballers
2008 Africa Cup of Nations players
2010 Africa Cup of Nations players
2013 Africa Cup of Nations players
Zambian expatriate footballers
Expatriate footballers in France
Zambian expatriate sportspeople in France
Expatriate footballers in the Netherlands
Zambian expatriate sportspeople in the Netherlands
Expatriate footballers in China
Zambian expatriate sportspeople in China
Zambian Christians